Princess Louise Margaret of Prussia (Louise Margaret Alexandra Victoria Agnes; 25 July 1860 – 14 March 1917), later Duchess of Connaught and Strathearn VA CI RRC DStJ, was a member of the House of Hohenzollern and of the British royal family. She served as the viceregal consort of Canada while her husband, Prince Arthur, Duke of Connaught and Strathearn, served as the governor general, from 1911 to 1916.

Early life

Princess Louise Margaret was born at Marmorpalais (Marble Palace) near Potsdam, Kingdom of Prussia. Her father was Prince Friedrich Karl of Prussia (1828–1885), the son of Karl of Prussia (1801–1883) and his wife Princess Marie of Saxe-Weimar-Eisenach (1808–1877). Her mother was Princess Maria Anna of Anhalt (1837–1906), daughter of Leopold IV of Anhalt-Dessau. Her father, a nephew of the German Emperor Wilhelm I, distinguished himself as a field commander during the Battle of Metz and the campaigns west of Paris in the 1870–71 Franco-Prussian War.  Her father was a double cousin of the German Emperor Friedrich III, the husband of her sister-in-law, Victoria, Princess Royal.

Marriage

On 13 March 1879, Princess Louise Margaret married Prince Arthur, Duke of Connaught and Strathearn at St. George's Chapel  Windsor. Prince Arthur was the seventh child and third son of Queen Victoria and Prince Albert of Saxe-Coburg and Gotha. An account cited that it was a love match, with the princess also keen to get away from royal residence in Berlin and from her father's bullying.

The wedding was described as grand and the couple received a great number of expensive gifts; the Queen's gift consisted of a diamond tiara, a pearl and diamond pendant. Many members of England and Germany's royal families attended; these included the Prince and Princess of Wales. Queen Victoria herself was wearing the Koh-i-Noor diamond and a long white veil. After her marriage, Princess Louise was styled Her Royal Highness The Duchess of Connaught and Strathearn and her name was Anglicised as Louise Margaret.

The couple had three children: Princess Margaret (1882–1920), Prince Arthur (1883–1938), and Princess Patricia (1886–1974). Princess Margaret married Prince Gustaf Adolf of Sweden and was the grandmother of King Carl XVI of Sweden, Queen Anne-Marie of Greece, and Queen Margrethe II of Denmark. Prince Arthur served as the governor-general of South Africa.

Duchess of Connaught

The Duchess of Connaught spent the first twenty years of her marriage accompanying her husband on his various deployments throughout the British Empire. The Duke and Duchess of Connaught acquired Bagshot Park in Surrey as their country home and after 1900 used Clarence House as their London residence. She accompanied her husband to Canada in 1911, when he began his term as governor-general. In 1916, she became colonel-in-chief of the 199th Canadian (Overseas) Infantry Battalion (The Duchess of Connaught's Own Irish-Canadian Rangers), CEF after Harry Trihey, the regiment's principal organizer and first commanding officer during World War I, secured her as patron. In 1885, she became chief of the 64th (8th Brandenburg) Regiment of Infantry "Field Marshal General Prince Friedrich Karl of Prussia", Prussian Army.

Death and legacy
The Duchess of Connaught died of influenza and bronchitis at Clarence House. She became the first member of the British royal family to be cremated. This was done at Golders Green Crematorium. The procedure of burying ashes in an urn was still unfamiliar at the time, and her urn was transported in an ordinary coffin during the funeral ceremonies. King George V still ordered four weeks of mourning dress and a military guard of honor during the funeral. Her ashes were placed in the Royal Vault at St George's Chapel, Windsor Castle and eventually buried at the Royal Burial Ground, Frogmore. The Duke of Connaught survived her by almost twenty-five years.

The maternity hospital adjacent to the Cambridge Military Hospital at Aldershot was named in her honor as the Louise Margaret Maternity Hospital. She laid the foundation stone of this hospital, which was constructed for the wives and children of the Aldershot Garrison.

Titles, styles, honours and arms

Titles and styles
25 July 1860 – 13 March 1879: Her Royal Highness Princess Louise Margaret of Prussia
13 March 1879 – 14 March 1917: Her Royal Highness The Duchess of Connaught and Strathearn

Honours
CI: Companion of the Crown of India, March 1879
VA: Royal Order of Victoria and Albert, 1st Class, 1893
DStJ: Lady of Justice of St. John, 1888
RRC: Member of the Royal Red Cross, 1883
 : Grand Cordon of the Precious Crown, 8 May 1890

Arms

Issue

Ancestry

References

|-

1860 births
1917 deaths
People from Potsdam
People from the Province of Brandenburg
House of Hohenzollern
House of Saxe-Coburg and Gotha (United Kingdom)
Canadian viceregal consorts
Connaught and Strathearn
Princesses of Saxe-Coburg and Gotha
Companions of the Order of the Crown of India
Dames of Justice of the Order of St John
Members of the Royal Red Cross
Ladies of the Royal Order of Victoria and Albert
Grand Cordons of the Order of the Precious Crown
Burials at the Royal Burial Ground, Frogmore
Women in 19th-century warfare
Wives of British princes
Deaths from influenza
Infectious disease deaths in England
Royal reburials
Wives of knights